Weaponize may refer to:
using anything as a weapon

Music
Weaponize, album by Kay Hanley 2008 
"Weaponize", song by Pegboard Nerds
"Weaponize", song by Rebaelliun